Alonso III Fonseca (Santiago de Compostela, 1475–1534) was a Galician archbishop and politician.  He was archbishop of Santiago de Compostela from 1507, and archbishop of Toledo from 1523.  He was a major supporter of the University of Santiago de Compostela.  He was the son of the archbishop Alonso II Fonseca and Alonso II's concubine María de Ulloa.

His older brother was Diego II de Acevedo, first Count of Andrade.  They had different surnames because a younger son (i.e. Alonso III Fonseca) would take the surname of his father (“Fonseca”) and the older son would take the name of his grandmother (the mother of his father the archbishop), which was “Acevedo.”

Early life and career as Archbishop of Santiago de Compostela

As archbishop, he was forced to confront Condado de Altamira, Count of Altamira, because the count was meddling in the affairs of the Tierras de Santiago, and also put a stop to the injustices committed by the governors there, taking advantage of his close relations with the Spanish monarchy as well as the papacy.  He was also involved in lawsuits against the Benedictine monks of San Martín Pinario, during a resurgence of this religious order in Galicia.

He presided over his father’s funeral in 1512, at which Gonzalo Fernández de Córdoba, known as "The Great Captain", attended, and Fernández de Córdoba symbolically offered his weapons to Saint James the Great (Santiago) at the funeral.

Political career 

He assumed the leadership of the Galician nobility, who wished to maintain their privileges, and was named by Charles V as a member of the Royal Council.  The Galician nobility was not included in the Cortes (Legislature) of Santiago and the Cortes of A Coruña, and Fonseca led the fight for their inclusion in these legislative bodies.  Fonseca presided over an assembly at Melide, whose aims for the Kingdom of Galicia included demands for legislative representation and a new board of trade (casa de contratación) based at A Coruña.  He also served as a mediator in the War of the Germanías.

Archbishop of Toledo

In 1523, he was named Archbishop of Toledo, and in this position, served as a patron to scholars, artists, and humanists.  He baptized Philip II of Spain in May 1527. His main place of residence was at Alcalá de Henares, where he died on February 4, 1534. He was buried at Salamanca.

He had a son, the result of an affair with the noblewoman Juana de Pimentel. Fonseca's son later served the Spanish king and inherited property in Galicia.

Legacy
The definitive consolidation of the University of Santiago de Compostela comes with Fonseca. Fonseca was an extremely erudite man, a Renaissance man and patron of numerous artists of the time, who was in touch with important thinkers such as Erasmus of Rotterdam.  Around 1507 the old Pilgrim's Hospital in Santiago de Compostela was purchased with the aim of transforming it into a university college.  The Santiago Alfeo College, today known as the Fonseca College, was also built, which became the centre of the university life till the second half of the 18th century and still remains emblematic in today's university.

Spanish politicians
1475 births
1534 deaths
Archbishops of Santiago de Compostela
Archbishops of Toledo
University of Salamanca alumni